"No Time to Bleed" is a song by American deathcore band Suicide Silence. The song was released as the third and final single and is the title track from the band's second full-length album of the same name.

Background
Like the band's previous single, "Disengage" the single is released as a 7" inch vinyl in limited edition, but is also available for download via iTunes, and features a dubstep-influenced remix of the song handled by Cameron "Big Chocolate" Argon as well as the album version of the track. The single was released on January 15, 2011.

Track listing
"No Time to Bleed" - 2:22
"No Time to Bleed (Big Chocolate Remix)" - 4:57

Personnel
Suicide Silence
 Mitch Lucker – vocals
 Mark Heylmun – lead guitar
 Chris Garza – rhythm guitar
 Dan Kenny – bass
 Alex Lopez – drums
Production
Produced by Machine
Artwork by Joshua Belanger

References

2011 singles
Suicide Silence songs
2009 songs
Century Media Records singles